Mohammad Azharuddin is a former international cricketer who represented and captained the India national cricket team. Considered to be one of the greatest batsman to emerge from Indian cricket, he was well known for his "wristy strokeplay". A right-handed middle order batsman, Azharuddin scored 29 international centuries before the Board of Control for Cricket in India (BCCI) accused him of match-fixing in 2000, which marked the end of his cricket career. In a career that spanned 15 years, he played 99 Tests and 334 One Day Internationals (ODI) accumulating 6,215 and 9,378 runs respectively. Azharuddin was the first cricketer to score 9,000 runs in ODI cricket and remained the leading run-scorer until October 2000. He was named the "Indian Cricket Cricketer of the Year" before being included by Wisden as one of their five Cricketers of the Year in 1991.

Azharuddin made his Test and ODI debuts during England's 1984–85 tour of India. In Tests, he made centuries against all nations except West Indies and Zimbabwe. In his first Test appearance Azharuddin made 110, thus becoming the eighth Indian player to score a century on debut. With scores of 105 and 122 in the subsequent matches of the series, he became the first player to score a century in each of his first three Tests. Azharuddin equalled the record of Kapil Dev for the fastest century by an Indian in Test cricket, when he scored a century from 74 balls against South Africa in 1996. His highest score of 199 came against Sri Lanka at Kanpur in 1986. Azharuddin's 22 Test centuries were made at fifteen cricket grounds, nine of which were outside India. He scored a century in his last Test inningsagainst South Africain March 2000.

Azharuddin's first ODI century came two years after his debut when he made 108 against Sri Lanka. In 1987, he scored a 62-ball century against New Zealand at the Moti Bagh Stadium, Vadodara; the performance ensured India's victory and he was made the man of the match. His highest score of 153 not out was achieved in the later part of his career, against Zimbabwe, during which he was involved in a record partnership of 275 with Ajay Jadeja. Azharuddin made scores between 90 and 99 seven times during his ODI career.

Key

Test centuries

ODI centuries

Notes

References

External links
Player Profile: Mohammad Azharuddin from CricketArchive

Azharuddin, Mohammad
Azharuddin